Ahmed Shaban (born 8 March 1979) is an Egyptian sports shooter. He competed in the men's 25 metre rapid fire pistol event at the 2016 Summer Olympics.

References

External links
 
 

1979 births
Living people
Egyptian male sport shooters
Olympic shooters of Egypt
Shooters at the 2016 Summer Olympics
Place of birth missing (living people)